The 1959 French Grand Prix was a Formula One motor race held at Reims on 5 July 1959. It was race 4 of 9 in the 1959 World Championship of Drivers and race 3 of 8 in the 1959 International Cup for Formula One Manufacturers. It was the 37th French Grand Prix and the twelfth to be held at the Reims highway circuit and the fourth to be held on the longer and faster 8.348 km layout. The race was held over 50 laps of the eight kilometre circuit for a race distance of 417 kilometres.

The race was won by British driver Tony Brooks driving a Ferrari 246 F1. Brooks dominated the race, leading all 50 laps and winning by 27 seconds over his American Scuderia Ferrari teammate Phil Hill. Brooks said after the race a sticking throttle in the closing laps made it more difficult than the result seemed. Australian driver Jack Brabham was over a minute behind in third position driving a Cooper T51 for the factory Cooper racing team after stopping to get new goggles as the circuit broke up.

Race day was very hot, to the point where the bitumen started to melt. Race cars were dislodging aggregate stones as the race went on causing American Masten Gregory to retire with cuts to his face, and Graham Hill to retire his Lotus 16 after his radiator was holed.

Stirling Moss was disqualified from eighth position after receiving a push-start in his British Racing Partnership entered BRM P25. Moss had pushed his car hard trying to overcome a failing gearbox, claiming a new lap record. Jean Behra too pushed hard in his Ferrari 246 F1, climbing into third racing against no less than four teammates at this race. Behra's engine broke under his charge and the Frenchman had a heated discussion with team manager Romolo Tavoni which ended with Behra punching Tavoni. It would be Behra's last race for Ferrari, with the Frenchman being fired for the assault.

The win was the first of the season for Scuderia Ferrari and moved Brooks into second place overall, five points behind Brabham. Hill's second position moved him into third in the championship.

Classification

Qualifying

Race

Notes
 – 1 point for fastest lap

Championship standings after the race

Drivers' Championship standings

Constructors' Championship standings

 Notes: Only the top five positions are included for both sets of standings.

References

French Grand Prix
French Grand Prix
European Grand Prix
1959 in French motorsport